Lieutenant Commander Shepard, better known as Commander Shepard, is the player character in the Mass Effect video game series by BioWare (Mass Effect, Mass Effect 2, and Mass Effect 3).

A veteran soldier of the Systems Alliance Navy, an N7 graduate of the Interplanetary Combatives Training (ICT) military program, and the first human Citadel Council Spectre, Shepard works to stop the Reapers, a sentient machine race dedicated to wiping out all advanced organic life. Shepard is neither a hero, nor a villain; depending upon players' choices and actions, Shepard is the abstaining factor that acts as both on occasion, and will take whatever action is deemed necessary when presented with impossible scenarios.

Shepard's gender, class, first name and facial appearance are chosen and customised by the player. Mark Meer provides the voice for the male Shepard, while the default male Shepard's face and body were based on Mark Vanderloo. Jennifer Hale voices the female Shepard. Since the player can choose the gender of Shepard, much of the dialogue revolving around the character is gender-neutral with only a few exceptions. However, in some other Mass Effect media, Shepard is called "he" regardless of player choice for the gender.

The character is inspired by and named after American astronaut Alan Shepard. Shepard's armor developed over the series, and was originally intended to be red-and-white. Most promotional material for the series focused on the male Shepard, due to the studio's desire for a single identifiable hero, though both versions of the character were given equal priority during development. Various merchandise has been made, including several figurines. Shepard has made cameo appearances in other Electronic Arts games and is referenced in Mass Effect: Andromeda.

Concept and creation
BioWare wanted players to feel special and empowered from the start of the game. Unlike other role-playing game protagonists, they felt Shepard should not be an entirely blank character for the player to create, in order to create a more "intense" experience; with Mass Effect being more cinematic than other BioWare video games, they felt they needed an "extra bit" with a sense of a specific flavor that can be caused by a memorable character, such as Star Treks Captain Kirk or  24s Jack Bauer.

Developers wanted to at least give Shepard a last name so that other characters could address them. The developers wanted a name that was both "all-American" and common, which led them to start looking at the original seven astronauts. Alan Shepard was chosen due to fitting with the idea of "their" Shepard, being tough and respected, and fitting in with the character being the first human Spectre – Alan Shepard being the first American in space.

During the development of the first game, the female Shepard was given equal importance as the male counterpart; unique lines were written for her as well as a unique romance option. In fact, the early model for animation tests featured a female Shepard. When describing her, Casey Hudson said "[s]he's not a caricature of the idea of role-playing as a female, but instead she's very impressive as a strong female character that's sensitive yet extremely confident and assertive".

Appearance and design
Shepard's default armor was originally red-and-white, but this was changed to charcoal grey, with a red-and-white stripe and the N7 logo, as Shepard looked too much like a medic. The red stripe in the N7 logo is said to symbolise the blood the character must sacrifice to save the galaxy. The armor became piece-based in Mass Effect 2 to stress the character's silhouette, as well as making them look "stronger and able to take more punishment". Despite this, the colours, as well as other elements of the armor and the commander's appearance, are customisable in Mass Effect 2.

For the character customisation at the start of the game, they focused on "quality and realism". In order to test out the customisation system, the team made various celebrity look-alikes to ensure it offered a wide enough variety. The default male face, as well as the male body, were based on Dutch model Mark Vanderloo.  The default female face changed slightly between the first and second game, but underwent a big redesign for Mass Effect 3. Six different designs for the default female Shepard were hosted online, and fans were told to vote for whichever design they preferred via Facebook; many different designs were made before the vote, but were whittled down to six by BioWare staff. The blonde Shepard with freckles won, though BioWare later decided that the hairstyle may have interfered with the vote, and so made another competition to decide that. The red-haired Shepard won the subsequent competition.

Voice

The male and female versions of Shepard were voiced by Mark Meer and Jennifer Hale respectively. Both of them had worked with BioWare many times previously.

Meer had first worked with BioWare during the creation of Baldur's Gate II: Shadows of Amn, and went on to voice other bit parts in their games. When he was first called in to work on Mass Effect, he expected to voice more bit parts, and was "pleasantly surprised" to get the role of Shepard. Caroline Livingstone gave voice direction during recording, and lead writer Mac Walters would occasionally sit in during recording sessions, allowing lines to be changed quickly.

Hale has said she is very invested in helping to "create" the stories of video games, though she herself is not a gamer. Although Hale does object to certain lines if they seem out-of-character in other works, she prefers not to mess with the words for Shepard and BioWare. That BioWare did not change the words based on gender considerations was one of Hale's favorite aspects of the series.

Appearances
Lieutenant Commander Shepard serves as the player character of the main Mass Effect game trilogy. The commander is a graduate of the Systems Alliance's – the "galactic face of humanity" – military N7 program, the highest grade of their "Interplanetary Combatives Training" that commands a great deal of respect. Their service before joining the military and the military event that allowed them to rise to fame are both chosen by the player before the game starts, out of three options each. Also customizable is Shepard's gender, character class and physical appearance. The player is given paraphrased dialogue options via a radial command menu called the "dialogue wheel", which Shepard will expand on when clicked. Different choices on the dialogue wheel can grant either Paragon or Renegade points, which will overtime affect their physical appearance in Mass Effect 2 and Mass Effect 3: a higher Renegade score will cause Shepard's scars to worsen and their eyes to start glowing red, while a higher Paragon score will cause Shepard's scars to gradually heal and fade away.

Outside of the main trilogy, Shepard has been briefly mentioned in the novels Mass Effect: Ascension, Retribution, and Deception, and has also made a brief appearance in the third issue of the comic Homeworlds, with only the N7 logo on their armour being shown in-shot. Redemption, taking place two years before the second game's main events, concerns how Shepard's body was retrieved by Liara T'Soni and then given to Cerberus after the character's death in Mass Effect 2s prologue. The character, however, will not be making any further appearances in any Mass Effect games now that the main trilogy is over, and BioWare have said that they do not wish the next Mass Effect protagonist to just be another soldier or "Shepard 2".

Mass Effect

In the first game, the commander is serving under Captain David Anderson during the shakedown run of the highly advanced turian/human ship SSV Normandy, heading toward humanity's first ever colony, Eden Prime. However, it turns out the ship is actually being sent to collect a Prothean beacon (the Protheans being an advanced and now-extinct race whose technology could contain great discoveries) and give it to the Citadel Council, an executive committee who hold great sway in the galaxy, and who are recognised as an authority by most of explored space. A Spectre, an elite agent of the Council with the authority to deal with situations "in whatever way they deem necessary", named Nihlus Kryik accompanies the mission to observe Shepard's candidacy to join the Spectres; if successful, this would make Shepard the first ever human Spectre and an exemplar of humanity's progress in galactic politics. However, Nihlus is killed during the mission when the geth, a race of sentient AIs, and Saren Arterius, a rogue Spectre, attack the colony to steal the beacon. Shepard manages to stop the colony from being destroyed, but is hit by a blast from the damaged beacon before it blows up; as a result, Shepard begins to have visions of war and death.

After Saren's treachery is exposed to the Council through the use of an audio recording that mentions "the Reapers", which are believed to be a race of synthetic-organic starships that eradicate all organic civilization every 50,000 years, the Council revoke Saren's Spectre status and make Shepard the first ever human Spectre, though they believe the Reapers are merely a myth Saren is using to manipulate the geth. Shepard is instructed to take down Saren, and is placed in charge of the Normandy and given free rein of the galaxy. Over the course of the game, it becomes clear that the visions are images of the Protheans being destroyed by the Reapers; the commander speaks to one of these Reapers, referred to as Sovereign, on the planet of Virmire, though the Council still believes them to be a myth.

Eventually, Saren, Sovereign and the geth launch an attack on the Citadel, the "political, cultural, and financial capital of the galactic community" and home of the Council, intending to activate a mass relay inside it that will allow all the Reapers to arrive at once from dark space, destroy the Citadel, and begin their "harvest" of organic life. Shepard manages to stop them, destroy Sovereign, and save the Citadel. Depending on the player's choices, Shepard may either also save the Council, or leave them to die to ensure Sovereign is destroyed or to build a new human-centric Council.

Mass Effect 2

At the beginning of the game, Shepard is killed when the Collectors attack and destroy the Normandy. The commander is revived by Cerberus, a human-supremacist organization considered to be terrorists by the Citadel Council and the Systems Alliance, with instructions by Cerberus leader the Illusive Man to be brought back unaltered and exactly as they were before their death. The Illusive Man provides Shepard with both a new ship (the Normandy SR-2) and a crew, and sends them on various missions against the Collectors, who are revealed to be puppets of the Reapers.

Over the course of the game, Shepard must assemble a team to prepare for a final assault on the Collector base accessible only through the Omega-4 Relay, a relay that destroys all non-Collector ships that try to go through it. Depending on the player's choices during the final mission, it is possible that Shepard may fail to escape the Collector base and die, though the save cannot be imported to Mass Effect 3 if this is the case. At the end of this mission, the player is given the choice to either destroy the base or hand it over to Cerberus – if the player chooses the former, Shepard effectively cuts all ties with Cerberus, and the crew and squadmates join the commander.

Depending on the player's decision concerning the Council in the first game, Shepard can either be reinstated as a Spectre now that they have been revived, be rejected by Udina and the rest of the Council, or refuse Spectre status when offered it.

Mass Effect 3

Shepard has been grounded and stripped of rank by the Alliance before the game starts, due to either working with Cerberus or blowing up a Mass Relay in the Mass Effect 2 DLC pack  Arrival. After Earth is invaded by the Reapers, the Alliance reinstates them and sends them to ask the Council for help, retaking command of the Alliance-refitted Normandy SR-2. Though the Council refuses, they either reinstate or uphold the commander's Spectre status.

Shepard must then work to forge alliances between the various alien races to ensure the survival of Earth and to stop the Reapers from eradicating all organic life from the galaxy. Among the major decisions made by the player as part of the branching narrative of Mass Effect 3 include the resolution of the Krogan Genophage storyline, the outcome of the war between the geth and the quarians, and ultimately the fate of the Reapers and the rest of the galactic community.

Following the conclusion of one of the three original endings of Mass Effect 3, where Shepard activates a superweapon known as the Crucible on the Citadel to deal with the Reapers, the Normandy crashes on a distant planet after being caught in a wave of energy emitted by the Crucible. In some of the possible ending scenarios, the crew eulogizes Shepard by putting his or her name on the ship's memorial and flying away. If Shepard chose to destroy the Reapers, however, the crew will hesitate placing Shepard's name on the memorial wall. In one possible ending, the chestpiece of a body with the N7 emblem is shown to be moving, suggesting Shepard might have survived.

Mass Effect: Andromeda

Shepard does not make a direct appearance, though players can select Shepard's gender at the start of the game. Shepard is referenced both in conversations between characters, and in audio logs sent by Liara T'Soni to Alec Ryder, the player character's father.

Promotion and merchandise
The default male Shepard was used heavily in marketing, being featured on the covers for all three games and most trailers. The female Shepard was confirmed to be making an appearance in one of the trailers for the third game, and on one side of  Mass Effect 3s Collector's Edition, in June 2011. The female Shepard had not been advertised heavily previously as marketing wanted to only showcase one character, so that consumers could easily understand who the hero was. For Mass Effect 3, BioWare wished to "acknowledge" the demand for material with the female Shepard.

Outside of the Mass Effect series, Shepard has also made cameo appearances in other Electronic Arts games. SkyHeroes features various different characters from EA games, acting as playable pilots during the game's multiplayer mode. Through downloadable content released on March 27, Shepard becomes available as an alternate skin for Serah and Noel within Final Fantasy XIII-2. An N7 armor and omni-blades become available in Kingdoms of Amalur: Reckoning if the demo for Mass Effect 3 has been completed; similarly, an N7 armor becomes available in Dead Space 3 if the player owns a copy of Mass Effect 3.

Reception
The character has received a generally positive reception. Shepard was voted number 2 by readers in Game Informers poll of the top 30 video game characters, behind Halo protagonist Master Chief, and Game Informer similarly listed them as 99 on their countdown of 100 favourite video game heroes – though squadmate Garrus Vakarian was placed significantly ahead, at number 15. Eric Zipper of GameZone has listed the character as one of "the 8 coolest video game heroes who wouldn't be any fun to actually hang out with", citing how, as they're controlled by the player, their actions could be "wildly erratic".

Joe Juba, also writing for Game Informer, chose Shepard as their favourite protagonist in their "2012 RPG of the Year Awards", saying that while the player changed the tone and context of many parts of Mass Effect, "Shepard never comes out of it looking any less awesome". The commander was voted the primary Xbox 360 candidate in IGN's mock video game presidential election, with Marcus Fenix being chosen as vice-president; in the end, readers voted them second-place behind PlayStation 3 representatives Nathan Drake and Solid Snake. GameDaily's Chris Buffa listed the default male Shepard as one of the top 25 gaming hunks, citing how he is "a mysterious and battle hardened soldier that won't take guff from aliens." A reader's poll for their top ultimate RPG party choices, drawing from characters of several disparate RPG video game franchises, published by IGN in December 2014 placed Shepard at No. 2. Another reader's poll published by PC Gamer in 2015 reveal that Shepard was overall the fifth most popular Mass Effect character.

Maxim, however, criticised Shepard's armor when looking at "badass" powersuits, saying "there are eleven thousand different versions, so we've seen this look before." Andrew Goldfarb, for IGN, criticised the decision to revisit Shepard during the downloadable content of Mass Effect 3, believing that 3s ending was "final", and saying that he would have preferred to have a look at a new squad separate from Shepard.

Although Bioware reports showed that most players preferred male Shepard, sometimes referred to as "BroShep", at 82% of the time and only 18% of players chose to play as a female Shepard in Mass Effect 2, vocal support for her was high. The female Shepard was nicknamed "FemShep". PC Gamers Tom Francis listed an appearance of FemShep on the box as one of 15 things he wished to see from 3. Hale was nominated for "Best Performance By A Human Female" at the 2010 Spike Video Game Awards, though lost to fellow Mass Effect voice actor Tricia Helfer (playing Sarah Kerrigan in StarCraft II: Wings of Liberty).

See also
 Hawke (Dragon Age), another BioWare player character who is customizable to a certain degree

Explanatory notes

References

External links

Cyborg characters in video games
Fictional characters with disfigurements
Fictional characters with post-traumatic stress disorder
Fictional first officers
Fictional genocide perpetrators
Fictional lieutenant commanders
Fictional marksmen and snipers
Fictional military captains
Fictional military personnel in video games
Fictional military strategists
Fictional navy personnel
Fictional ship captains
Fictional soldiers in video games
Fictional sole survivors
Fictional special forces personnel
Fictional telekinetics
Fictional war veterans
Mass Effect characters
Orphan characters in video games
Space marines
Video game characters introduced in 2007
Video game characters of selectable gender
Video game mascots
Video game memes
Video game protagonists